Sir James Buchanan, 2nd Baronet DL (7 August 1840 – 16 October 1901) was a British Royal Navy officer and Deputy Lieutenant of Stirlingshire.

Family

Buchanan was born on 7 August 1840, the son of Rt. Hon. Sir Andrew Buchanan, 1st Baronet and Frances Katharine Mellish.

He married Arabella Catherine Colquitt-Craven, daughter of Goodwin Charles Colquitt-Craven of Brockhampton Park, near Cheltenham, on 19 February 1873. There were no children from this marriage.

Naval career

He joined the Royal Navy being mate on 12 April 1860, lieutenant on 22 May 1861, and gained the rank of commander in the service of the Royal Navy. By 1867 he was aboard  as lieutenant commander until he was invalided. He retired from the Royal Navy on 30 January 1873.

Later life

He succeeded to the title of 2nd Baronet Buchanan, of Dunburgh on 13 November 1882.

He held the office of Justice of the Peace, and Deputy Lieutenant of Stirlingshire.

He died at his residence, Craigend Castle, Milngavie, near Glasgow, on 16 October 1901, at age 61, and was succeeded in the baronetcy by his brother, Eric Alexander Buchanan.

Arms

References

1840 births
1901 deaths
Baronets in the Baronetage of the United Kingdom
Royal Navy officers
Deputy Lieutenants of Nottinghamshire